Vitaly Janelt (born 10 May 1998) is a German professional footballer who plays as a defensive midfielder for  club Brentford.

Janelt is a product of the Hamburger SV and RB Leipzig academies and made his professional breakthrough at VfL Bochum in 2017, before moving to England to join Brentford in 2020. He was capped by Germany at youth level and was a part of the 2021 European U21 Championship-winning squad.

Club career

RB Leipzig
After beginning his career with spells in the youth systems at Bargfelder SV, SSC Hagen Ahrensburg and Hamburger SV, Janelt joined the academy at RB Leipzig in 2014, for a fee reported to be €150,000. He signed a five-year professional contract in July 2016 and progressed to the reserve team, for which he made six Regionalliga Nordost appearances during the 2016–17 season. Prior to Janelt's departure from the Red Bull Arena at the end of the 2017–18 season, disciplinary issues led to him spending 18 months away on loan. He failed to win a call into a first team matchday squad during his time with RB Leipzig.

VfL Bochum

On 9 January 2017, Janelt joined 2. Bundesliga club VfL Bochum on loan until 30 June 2018, with an option to buy. He made 20 appearances during an injury-affected spell and signed a three-year contract with the club on 30 May 2018, for an undisclosed fee. Janelt looked set to make a breakthrough late in the 2018–19 season, before a torn adductor ruled him out of the final eight matches of the campaign. He broke into the first team in 2019–20, making 24 appearances during a season which was ended prematurely by the COVID-19 pandemic. In the final season of his contract, Janelt departed VfL Bochum in October 2020 and made 54 appearances during  years at the Ruhrstadion. In December 2021, Janelt stated that he "struggled to find consistency" during his spell with the club. He was frequently deployed as a utility player, filling in as a left winger, central defender and on one occasion, as a stand-in goalkeeper late in a match.

Brentford
On 3 October 2020, Janelt moved to England to sign a four-year contract with Championship club Brentford for an undisclosed fee, reported to be €600,000. Despite being earmarked by co-director of football Rasmus Ankersen as an overseas player who would "need time to adapt to English football", an injury suffered by first-choice defensive midfielder Christian Nørgaard in the days following the transfer allowed Janelt to break into the matchday squad. By late October, he had assumed Nørgaard's starting role. Janelt retained his place throughout the campaign and finished Brentford's 2021 EFL Championship play-off Final-winning 2020–21 season with 47 appearances and four goals.

Janelt began the 2021–22 season as an ever-present starter in Premier League matches and he scored his first goal of the season in a 3–3 draw with Liverpool on 25 September 2021. Aside from missing one month due to a thigh injury suffered in October 2021, Janelt continued in his virtual ever-present role and signed a new four-year contract on 1 April 2022. The following day, he scored his third and fourth goals of the season in a 4–1 win over Chelsea and finished the campaign with 35 appearances.

Janelt began the 2022–23 season primarily in a substitute role, but captained the club for the first time during a 2–0 EFL Cup second round win over Colchester United on 23 August 2022.

International career
Janelt was capped by Germany at U15, U17, U19, U20 and U21 levels. He was a part of the Germany squads at the 2015 UEFA European U17 Championship and the 2015 U17 World Cup. Janelt made four appearances during the U21 team's successful 2021 UEFA European U21 Championship qualifying campaign. He made four substitute appearances during the team's successful finals campaign. On 25 September 2021, it was reported that German senior head coach Hansi Flick was present at one of Janelt's club matches.

Style of play
A defensive midfielder or "number eight", Janelt is "strong, versatile, commanding, composed in possession, possesses great awareness, is a good passer and an aggressive winner of the ball". He had also been deployed at centre back and left back.

Personal life
Janelt's brothers Vincent and Victor became footballers in the German lower leagues.

Career statistics

Honours
Brentford
EFL Championship play-offs: 2021
Germany U21

 UEFA European U21 Championship: 2021

References

External links

Vitaly Janelt at brentfordfc.com

1998 births
Living people
Footballers from Hamburg
German footballers
Germany youth international footballers
Germany under-21 international footballers
Association football midfielders
RB Leipzig II players
RB Leipzig players
VfL Bochum players
Brentford F.C. players
Regionalliga players
2. Bundesliga players
English Football League players
German expatriate footballers
Expatriate footballers in England
German expatriate sportspeople in England
Premier League players